German submarine U-856 was a Type IXC/40 U-boat built for Nazi Germany's Kriegsmarine during World War II.

Design
German Type IXC/40 submarines were slightly larger than the original Type IXCs. U-856 had a displacement of  when at the surface and  while submerged. She had two shafts and two  propellers.

U-856 was fitted with six  torpedo tubes (four fitted at the bow and two at the stern), 22 torpedoes, one  SK C/32 naval gun, 180 rounds, and a  SK C/30 as well as a  C/30 anti-aircraft gun. The boat had a complement of forty-eight.

Service history
U-856 was ordered on 5 June 1941 from DeSchiMAG AG Weser in Bremen under the yard number 1062. Her keel was laid down on 31 October 1942 and the U-boat was launched the following year on 11 May 1943. She was commissioned into service under the command of Oberleutnant zur See Friedrich Wittenberg (Crew X/37) in 4th U-boat Flotilla.

The U-boat was working up for deployment in the Baltic Sea until transferring to the 2nd U-boat Flotilla for front-line service. She left Kiel on 24 February 1944 for operations off the US east coast. In March she had two brief encounters with submarine-hunting aircraft, but escaped unscathed. When the U-boat re-surfaced a little while later, she came under heavy artillery fire from the US warships. Wittenberg ordered the crew to abandon ship and scuttled her. Of the 55 men on board only 28, Wittenberg among them, survived. They were picked up by the destroyers and brought to New York City where they disembarked on 10 April 1944.

References

Bibliography

External links

World War II submarines of Germany
German Type IX submarines
1943 ships
U-boats commissioned in 1943
U-boats scuttled in 1944
Ships built in Bremen (state)
Maritime incidents in April 1944